The LORAN-C transmitter Gillette was a LORAN-C transmission facility near Gillette, Wyoming at . Its aerial, a  guyed radio mast, was the tallest structure in Wyoming at one time.

The station was closed on February 8, 2010, as a budget cut.  The station, and all of the others, were considered to be obsolete with the general availability of GPS devices.

See also
 List of masts

References

External links
 

Military installations in Wyoming
Gillette
Closed facilities of the United States Coast Guard
Towers in Wyoming
2010 disestablishments in Wyoming